Naan Oru Malaysian is a 1991 Malaysian Tamil-language film directed by Suhan Panchacharam starring himself. This was the first Tamil film to be made by Malaysians and shot in Malaysia. The first Tamil film to be made by Malaysians was Ratha Pei (1969); however, that film was shot in India.

Synopsis 
The film is about a man who falls in love with a woman in an estate.

Cast 
Suhan Panchacharam as Raja
K. Gunasegaran
K. S. Maniam
Manivasan
Bairogi Narayanan
Ramesh
Devisri
S. Gana Pragasam

Production 
Suhan "Pansha" Panchacharam, who starred in the Tamil television series Adutha Veedu made his directorial debut with this film. The film was shot on 35 mm movie film.

Themes and influences 
The scene where the heroine proves her virginity by walking in fire similar to Sita in Ramayana was viewed critically by females.

Box office 
The film ran for a week and collected RM 150,000. The film ran full house at Federal Cinema in Kuala Lumpur. The political tension between two rival political parties negatibvely impacted collections. Later Tamil films such as Chemman Sallai, Andaal and Uyir were better received than this film.

References

1990s Tamil-language films
Tamil-language Malaysian films